Bački Breg is a village located in the Sombor municipality, in the West Bačka District of Serbia. It is situated in the autonomous province of Vojvodina. As of 2011, it has a population of 1,140 inhabitants. The village has a Croat (Šokac) ethnic majority.

Bački Breg is in the very northwest of Serbia, on an important highway linking Serbia and Hungary together. The Hungarian town across the border is Hercegszántó.

Name
In Serbian the village is known as Bački Breg or Бачки Брег, in Croatian as Bereg (since 2009) or Bački Breg (before 2009), in Hungarian as Béreg, and in German as Bereg.

History
It was first mentioned in 1319. In 1620, the village was settled by Šokci who originating from Klis near Split. The first church in the village was founded in 1740. In the 18th century, Germans and Hungarians settled here as well.

Demographics
As of 2011 census results, the village has 1,140 inhabitants.

Historical population
 1961: 2,045
 1971: 2,006
 1981: 1,770
 1991: 1,585
 2002: 1,388
 2011: 1,140

Ethnic groups
The ethnic composition of the village (2002 census):
 Croats =738 (53.17%)
 Serbs = 344 (24.78%)
 Yugoslavs = 67 (4.83%)
 Hungarians = 34 (2.45%)
 Others = 24 (2.25%)

See also
 List of places in Serbia
 List of cities, towns and villages in Vojvodina

References
 Slobodan Ćurčić, Broj stanovnika Vojvodine, Novi Sad, 1996.

External links

 www.soinfo.org

Places in Bačka
Sombor
Hungary–Serbia border crossings
West Bačka District
Croatian communities